The Ireland national rugby union team toured the South Seas in June 2003, playing matches against Australia, Tonga and Western Samoa. Head coach Eddie O'Sullivan initially selected a squad of 41 players for the tour. Keith Wood also travelled with the tour party as an additional player for training purposes. However Rob Henderson, Denis Hickie and Anthony Foley all subsequently withdrew due to injuries and Frankie Sheahan had to return home after testing positive for Salbutamol. Aiden McCullen and Mike Mullins were both then called up as replacements. Mark McHugh marked his senior international debut with a try against Tonga while McCullen and Anthony Horgan made their senior international debuts against Samoa. In the same game, Ronan O'Gara gave a man of the match performance, scoring 32 of Ireland's 40 points.

Touring party

 Manager: Eddie O'Sullivan
 Captains: David Humphreys and Reggie Corrigan

Backs

Forwards

Matches

Australia 

Australia: 15. Chris Latham, 14. Wendell Sailor, 13. Morgan Turinui, 12. Steve Kefu, 11. Joe Roff, 10. Elton Flatley, 7. George Gregan (c), 6. Bill Young, 5. Jeremy Paul, 4. Patricio Noriega, 3. David Giffin, 2. Nathan Sharpe, 1. David Lyons, 9. George Smith – Replacements: 16. Brendan Cannon, 17. Ben Darwin, 18. Dan Vickerman, 19. Phil Waugh, 20. Chris Whitaker, 21. Nathan Grey, 22. Lote Tuqiri

Ireland: 15. Girvan Dempsey, 14. James Topping, 13. Geordan Murphy, 12. Kevin Maggs, 11. John Kelly, 10. David Humphreys (c), 7. Keith Gleeson, 6. Alan Quinlan, 5. Malcolm O'Kelly, 4. Gary Longwell, 3. Reggie Corrigan, 2. Shane Byrne, 1. Marcus Horan, 9. Peter Stringer – Replacements: 17. Emmet Byrne, 18. Paul O'Connell, 21. Ronan O'Gara – Unused: 16. Paul Shields, 19. Eric Miller, 20. Guy Easterby, 22. Tyrone Howe

Tonga 

Tonga: Gus Leger, 14. Pierre Hola, 13. Johnny Ngauamo, 12. John Payne, 11. Simana Mafile'o, 10. Toni Alatini, 9. David Palu, 8. Tonga Lea'aetoa, 7. Vili Ma'asi, 6. Hemani Lavaka, 5. Milton Ngauamo, 4. Nisifolo Naufahu, 3. Inoke Afeaki (c), 2. Stanley Afeaki, 1. Saia Latu – Replacements: 16. Ephraim Taukafa, 17. Kisi Pulu, 18. Viliami Vaki, 21. Taniela Tulia – Unused : 19. Benhur Kivalu, 20. Willie Gibbons, 22. Tevita Tu'ifua

Ireland: 15. Mark McHugh, 14. John Kelly, 13. Mike Mullins, 12. Jonny Bell, 11. Tyrone Howe, 10. Ronan O'Gara, 9. Guy Easterby, 8. Eric Miller, 7. Kieron Dawson, 6. Simon Easterby, 5. Paul O'Connell, 4. Leo Cullen, 3. Reggie Corrigan (c), 2. Shane Byrne, 1. Justin Fitzpatrick – Replacements: 17. Simon Best, 18. Donncha O'Callaghan, 19. David Wallace, 22. Gordon D'Arcy – Unused: 16. Paul Shields, 20. Brian O'Meara, 21. Paul Burke

Samoa 

Samoa: Fa'atonu Fili, 14. Lome Fa'atau, 13. Dale Rasmussen, 12. Brian Lima, 11. Ron Fanu'atanu, 10. Earl Va'a, 9. Denning Tyrell, 8. Kas Lealamanu'a, 7. Trevor Leota, 6. Jeremy Tomuli, 5. Opeta Palepoi, 4. Kitiona Viliamu, 3. Leo Lafaiali'i, 2. Maurie Fa'asavalu, 1. Semo Sititi (c) – Replacements: 16. Jonathan Meredith, 17. Tamato Leupolu, 18. Des Tuiali'i, 20. Steve So'oialo, 21. Gaolo Elisara – Unused : 19. Ponali Tapelu, 22. Dom Feau'nati

Ireland: 15. Girvan Dempsey, 14. John Kelly, 13. Mike Mullins, 12. Jonny Bell, 11. Anthony Horgan, 10. Ronan O'Gara, 9. Guy Easterby, 8. Eric Miller, 7. Aidan McCullen, 6. Simon Easterby, 5. Paul O'Connell, 4. Leo Cullen, 3. Reggie Corrigan (c), 2. Shane Byrne, 1. Marcus Horan – Replacements: 16. Paul Burke, 17. Gordon D'Arcy, 18. Donncha O'Callaghan, 19. Paul Shields, 20. Emmet Byrne, 21. Brian O'Meara, 22. David Wallace

References

2003
2003
2003
South Seas
2003 in Australian rugby union
2003 in Oceanian rugby union
2003 in Tongan rugby union
2003 in Samoan rugby union